Cyperus unispicatus is a species of sedge that is native to parts of Angola.

See also 
 List of Cyperus species

References 

unispicatus
Plants described in 2010
Flora of Angola